Leia Tânia do Bastião Dongue, a.k.a. Tanucha, born May 24, 1991, in Maputo, Mozambique, is a Mozambican basketball player. She is 185 cm (6'07") and plays as a small forward.

In May 2013, she was signed in by Primeiro de Agosto.

Tanucha was voted MVP at the 2014 Angola Women's Basketball League and at the 2014 and 2015 FIBA Africa Clubs Champions Cup.

References

External links
 FIBA.com Profile
 AfricaBasket Profile
 Scoresway Profile

1991 births
Living people
C.D. Primeiro de Agosto women's basketball players
Mozambican women's basketball players
Power forwards (basketball)
Sportspeople from Maputo